Experiment Zero is an album by the American band Man or Astro-man? It was released in 1996 by Touch and Go Records.

Production
Produced by Steve Albini, the album was recorded in three days.

Critical reception
The New York Times wrote that the band "deploys a manic punk velocity, and sprinkles its music with sine-wave oscillator noises and space-documentary sound bites; otherwise its material is fairly faceless." The Austin American-Statesman concluded that, as "a celebration of robotic white-guy stiffness, this music has the soul of a Jetsons episode."

Track listing
"Stereo Phase Test"
"Television Fission"
"DNI"
"Planet Collision"
"Big Trak Attack"
"9 Volt"
"Evil Plans of Planet Spectra"
"Anoxia"
"Maximum Radiation Level"
"King of the Monsters"
"Cyborg Control"
"Test Driver" (Takeshi Terauchi)
"Television Man" (Talking Heads)
"Z-X3"
"Principles Unknown"
"The Space Alphabet" - (Vinyl-only bonus track)

References

Man or Astro-man? albums
1996 albums
Touch and Go Records albums